Horst-Günther von Fassong (27 April 1919 – 1 January 1945) was a German Luftwaffe military aviator and fighter ace during World War II. Depending on source, he is credited between 63 and 136 aerial victories achieved in an unknown number of combat missions. This figure includes up to 90 aerial victories on the Eastern Front, and potentially further 46 victories over the Western Allies, including up to four four-engined bombers.

Born in Kassel, Fassong grew up in the Weimar Republic and Nazi Germany. A pre-war member of the German Army, he transferred to the Luftwaffe in 1940. Following flight training, he was posted to Jagdgeschwader 51 (JG 51—51st Fighter Wing) in 1941. Flying with this wing, Fassong claimed his first aerial victory on 3 July 1941 during Operation Barbarossa, the German invasion of the Soviet Union. He was made Staffelkapitän (squadron leader) of 10. Staffel (10th squadron) of JG 51 in February 1943. In May 1944, he was transferred and appointed Gruppenkommandeur (group commander) of III. Gruppe of Jagdgeschwader 11 (JG 11—11st Fighter Wing) fighting in Defense of the Reich. He was awarded the Knight's Cross of the Iron Cross on 27 July 1944 and killed in action on 1 January 1945 during Operation Bodenplatte.

Career
Fassong was born on 27 April 1919 in Kassel, at the time in the Province of Hesse-Nassau, a Free State of Prussia within the Weimar Republic. His military career began with Aufklärungsabteilung 7, a reconnaissance battalion of the 4th Panzer Division. In May 1940, Fassong transferred to the Luftwaffe where he was trained as a fighter pilot. In early 1941, he was posted to 3. Staffel (3rd squadron) of Jagdgeschwader 51 (JG 51—51st Fighter Wing). At the time, 3. Staffel was commanded by Oberleutnant Heinrich Krafft while I. Gruppe, to which the Staffel was subordinated, was headed by Hauptmann Hermann-Friedrich Joppien. The Gruppe was based on the English Channel, fighting the Royal Air Force (RAF). On 25 May, I. Gruppe was withdrawn from the Channel Front and moved to Krefeld Airfield for preparation for Operation Barbarossa, the German invasion of the Soviet Union.

Eastern Front
JG 51 area of operation during Operation Barbarossa was over the right flank of Army Group Center in the combat area of the 2nd Panzer Group as well as the 4th Army. In support of the Army crossing the Berezina, I. Gruppe was moved to an airfield at Babruysk on 2 July. The following day Fassong claimed his first two aerial victories in the vicinity of Rahachow when he shot down two Polikarpov I-16 fighters. German forces breached the Stalin Line and II. Fassong was severely injured, sustaining heavy burns, on 28 July when his Messerschmitt Bf 109 F-2 (Werknummer 9650—factory number) burst into flames during takeoff.

On 12 February 1943, Fassong was appointed Staffelkapitän (squadron leader) of 10. Staffel of JG 51. The Staffel was subordinated to IV. Gruppe of JG 51, initially commanded by Hauptmann Hans Knauth and as of 1 March, by Major Rudolf Resch. The Gruppe had just completed conversion from the Bf 109 F-2 to the Focke Wulf Fw 190 A-4 and was based at Smolensk. In that combat area, Army Group Centre had launched Operation Büffel, a series of retreats eliminating the Rzhev salient. On 10 June, during a Soviet attack on the Seshchinskaya and Bryansk Air Field, Fassong claimed three aerial victories in nine minutes.

Operation Citadel
On 5 July, German forces launched Operation Citadel in a failed attempt to eliminate the Kursk salient that initiated the Battle of Kursk. In preparation of this operation, IV. Gruppe was ordered to an airfield named Oryol-West and supported Generaloberst Walter Model's 9th Army on the northern pincer. That day, pilots of the Gruppe flew up to five combat missions in the combat area near Maloarkhangelsk. The Gruppe escorted bombers from Kampfgeschwader 4 (KG 4—4th Bomber Wing), KG 51 and KG 53 as well as Junkers Ju 87 dive bombers from Sturzkampfgeschwader 1 (StG 1—1st Dive Bomber Wing). The Gruppe claimed 36 aerial victories that day, including two Lavochkin La-5, an Ilyushin Il-2 ground attack aircraft, and a Douglas A-20 Havoc bomber also known as a Boston, by Fassong. The following day, Fassong for the first time became an "ace-in-a-day", claiming three Il-2 ground attack aircraft, two La-5 fighters and a Lavochkin-Gorbunov-Gudkov LaGG-3 fighter.

On 11 July, IV. Gruppe lost its commanding officer, Resch, who was killed in action. He was replaced by Major Hans-Ekkehard Bob who had to be transferred and took command of the Gruppe on 1 August. On 14 August, Fassong again became an "ace-in-a-day", and was credited with five Il-2 ground attack aircraft shot down west of Kharkov during the Soviet Belgorod–Kharkov offensive operation. Fassong was awarded the German Cross in Gold on 17 October 1943, and after 62 aerial victories was transferred to the Western Front.

Group commander
In early May 1944, Fassong was transferred to III. Gruppe of Jagdgeschwader 11 (JG 11—11th Fighter Wing), initially serving as Staffelkapitän of 7. Staffel after his predecessor had been killed in action. The Gruppe was based at Oldenburg Airfield and was fighting in Defence of the Reich. On 8 May, the United States Army Air Forces (USAAF) attacked Berlin and Braunschweig with 807 four-engined heavy bombers escorted by 855 fighter aircraft. JG 11 intercepted the bombers of the 1st and 3rd Bombardment Division on its way to Berlin in the vicinity of Verden an der Aller. In the resulting aerial combat, Fassong shot down a Boeing B-17 Flying Fortress bomber. Four days later on 12 May, the Eighth Army Air Force targeted the German fuel industry. In total 886 four-engined bombers, escorted by 980 fighter aircraft, headed for the five main synthetic fuel factories in middle Germany in area of Leuna, Merseburg, Böhlen and Zeitz, and the Protectorate of Bohemia and Moravia and Brüx. Defending against this attack, Fassong claimed a B-17 bomber shot down in a frontal attack on the bombers near Wiesbaden.

On 13 May, III. Gruppe moved from Oldenburg to Reinsehlen Airfield near Schneverdingen. On 22 May, 342 four-engined bombers 1st and 3rd Bombardment Division attacked Kiel. JG 11 fighters intercepted the USAAF bombers west of Neumünster. In this encounter Fassong claimed a B-17 bomber destroyed. In late May, Fassong succeeded Major Anton Hackl as Gruppenkommandeur (group commander) of III. Gruppe of JG 11. On 6 June, the Allies launched Operation Overlord, the successful invasion of German-occupied Western Europe, on 6 June. To defend against this invasion, the Luftwaffe relocated many of its fighter and bomber units to France. III. Gruppe was one of the few units not sent to France but at the time remained in Reinsehlen. In early June, the Gruppe was augmented by 2. Staffel of Jagdgeschwader 52 (JG 52—52nd Fighter Wing) led by Oberleutnant Paul-Heinrich Dähne. The Staffel then was redesignated and became the 12. Staffel of JG 11 and was subordinated to Fassong's command. When on 22 June Soviet forces launched Operation Bagration, III. Gruppe was ordered to relocate to the Eastern Front where it was to be deployed in the combat area of Minsk and fought in the Minsk Offensive. On 27 July, Fassong was awarded the Knight's Cross of the Iron Cross.

The Gruppe flew its last combat missions on the Eastern Front on 1 September. During its ten-week tenure in the east, III. Gruppe pilots claimed approximately 125 aerial victories, including nine by Fassong, for the loss of twelve pilots killed or missing and further eleven injured or wounded in combat. The Gruppe then moved to an airfield at Riesa-Leutewitz for a brief period of rest and replenishment. On 17 September 1944 Allied forces launched Operation Market Garden, the operation to cross the Rhine at Arnhem. The following day, III. Gruppe was ordered to Achmer Airfiled to support the German defense.

Operation Bodenplatte and death
In preparation for Operation Bodenplatte, III. Gruppe was moved to an airfield at Großostheim, near Aschaffenburg on 17 December 1944. Fassong had learned of the planned operation on 5 December at a meeting held at the headquarters of the II. Jagdkorps (2nd Fighter Corps) commanded by Generalmajor Dietrich Peltz, on 5 December. Fassong informed his Staffelkapitäne of the upcoming operation on 15 December without going into the specifics of the target and date. At 06:30 on 1 January, Fassong briefed his pilots of the operation and that their target would be the Asch Airfield (Designated: Y-29) located north-west of Maastricht. At 08:18, Fassong led a flight of 31 Fw 190 A-8 fighter aircraft to Frankfurt where they were joined by other Luftwaffe fighters.

Fassong was last seen in aerial combat near Maastricht. Unteroffizier Armin Mehling, Fassong's wingman, reported that Fassong was shot down by two P-47 Thunderbolts over Asch flying a Fw 190 A-8 (Werknummer 682 792—factory number). The flight was flying at a height of  when they were pounced upon by six P-47s. Fassong's aircraft was hit and burned immediately. The aircraft crashed in a big ball of flames near Opglabbeek. Following his death, command of III. Gruppe was given to Oberleutnant Paul-Heinrich Dähne.

Summary of career

Aerial victory claims
According to Spick, Fassong was credited with 136 aerial victories, 90 of which claimed over the Eastern Front and 46 in the western theater of operations, including four heavy bombers. Obermaier lists him with 75, potentially about 80, aerial victories, among them 10 claimed over the Western Front, including four heavy bombers. Mathews and Foreman, authors of Luftwaffe Aces — Biographies and Victory Claims, researched the German Federal Archives and found records for 63 aerial victory claims. This figure includes 61 aerial victories on the Eastern Front and two heavy bombers over the Western Allies.

Victory claims were logged to a map-reference (PQ = Planquadrat), for example "PQ 35 Ost 46443". These sectors were then subdivided into 36 smaller units to give a location area 3 × 4 km in size.

Awards
 Honour Goblet of the Luftwaffe on 20 September 1943 as Oberleutnant and pilot
 German Cross in Gold on 17 October 1943 as Oberleutnant in the 10./Jagdgeschwader 51
 Knight's Cross of the Iron Cross on 27 July 1944 as Hauptmann and Gruppenkommandeur of the III./Jagdgeschwader 11

Notes

References

Citations

Bibliography

 
 
 
 
 
 
 
 
 
 
 
 
 
 
 
 
 
 
 
 
 
 

1919 births
1945 deaths
Luftwaffe pilots
German World War II flying aces
Luftwaffe personnel killed in World War II
Aviators killed by being shot down
Military personnel from Kassel
People from Hesse-Nassau
Recipients of the Gold German Cross
Recipients of the Knight's Cross of the Iron Cross